Players and pairs who neither have high enough rankings nor receive wild cards may participate in a qualifying tournament held one week before the annual Wimbledon Tennis Championships.

The qualifying rounds for the 1998 Wimbledon Championships were played from 15 to 21 June 1998 at the Civil Service Sports Ground in Chiswick, London, United Kingdom.

Seeds

  Cara Black /  Irina Selyutina (qualified)
  Christína Papadáki /  Samantha Reeves (first round)
  Melissa Mazzotta /  Fabiola Zuluaga (first round)
  Haruka Inoue /  Larissa Schaerer (second round)

Qualifiers

  Cara Black /  Irina Selyutina
  Maureen Drake /  Lilia Osterloh

Lucky losers

  Brie Rippner /  Jessica Steck
  Tathiana Garbin /  Adriana Serra Zanetti

Qualifying draw

First qualifier

Second qualifier

External links

1998 Wimbledon Championships on WTAtennis.com
1998 Wimbledon Championships – Women's draws and results at the International Tennis Federation

Women's Doubles Qualifying
Wimbledon Championship by year – Women's doubles qualifying
Wimbledon Championships